The Glasgow and South Western Railway (GSWR) 46 class is a class of six 0-6-0 steam locomotives designed in 1862. They were Patrick Stirling’s second 0-6-0 design for the railway.

Development 
The six examples of this class were designed by Patrick Stirling for the GSWR and were built by Kilmarnock Locomotive Works (Works Nos. R4-R9) in 1864. They were numbered 46–51. The members of the class were fitted with domeless boilers and safety valves over the firebox, and weatherboards rather than cabs.

Withdrawal 
The locomotives were withdrawn between 1888 and 1893.

References 

 

046
Standard gauge steam locomotives of Great Britain
Railway locomotives introduced in 1862
0-6-0 locomotives